Abralia omiae is a species of enoploteuthid cephalopod known only from its type locality, the Dimitry Mendeleyev seamount (5˚N, 155˚E) in the Pacific tropics. A. omiae is a small species, less than 3 cm in mantle length.

References

Abralia
Molluscs described in 2000